Robert Allan Murray (born April 4, 1967) is a Canadian former professional ice hockey player. He is the head coach of the Tulsa Oilers of the ECHL. Murray played much of his career as captain of the American Hockey League's Springfield Falcons. He holds team records in single season penalty minutes (373), career assists (157), penalty minutes (1529), and games (501). His number 23 was retired by the Falcons, and remains honored by the successor team in the market, the Springfield Thunderbirds.

Playing career
As a youth, Murray played in the 1980 Quebec International Pee-Wee Hockey Tournament with the Toronto Marlboros minor ice hockey team.

Selected by the Washington Capitals in the 1985 NHL Entry Draft, Murray played parts of two seasons for the Capitals. At the end of the 1990–91 season, he was claimed by the Minnesota North Stars and was traded the very next day to the Winnipeg Jets. Murray would spend most of his time in the Jets' minor league affiliates; first the Moncton Hawks for three seasons, and then the Springfield Falcons for eight, for which he is the career games leader and longtime captain.

Following the Jets' franchise when it relocated to Phoenix, Murray would spend parts of two seasons until he was traded to the Edmonton Oilers although he would never actually play a game for the franchise. He retired from active play in 2003.

Murray was at one time the career penalty minute leader in the AHL, but has since been surpassed by Dennis Bonvie; he remains in second place in league history with 2940. In 2017, he was named to the AHL Hall of Fame.

Coaching career
After retirement, Murray was hired as an assistant coach for the Providence Bruins and was named their head coach in 2008 following Scott Gordon's hiring by the New York Islanders. He was let go following the 2010–11 season. On July 13, 2011, he was named the head coach of the Alaska Aces of the ECHL where he remained for six seasons. His Aces teams won three Brabham Cups for the best regular season records and one Kelly Cup for the playoff championship in 2014. He stayed with the Aces until the team folded following the 2016–17 season. He was then named head coach of the Tulsa Oilers in June 2017.

Career statistics

Regular season and playoffs

References

External links

1967 births
Living people
Baltimore Skipjacks players
Canadian ice hockey coaches
Canadian ice hockey centres
Fort Wayne Komets players
Hamilton Bulldogs (AHL) players
Moncton Hawks players
Peterborough Petes (ice hockey) players
Philadelphia Phantoms players
Phoenix Coyotes players
Providence Bruins coaches
Saint John Flames players
Ice hockey people from Toronto
Springfield Falcons players
Washington Capitals draft picks
Washington Capitals players
Winnipeg Jets (1979–1996) players